The R7 is a line of Rodalies de Catalunya's Barcelona commuter rail service, operated by Renfe Operadora. It links Sant Andreu Arenal railway station in northern Barcelona with Cerdanyola Universitat railway station, which serves the Bellaterra campus of the Autonomous University of Barcelona. According to 2010 data, the line's average weekday ridership is 8,140.

The line used most part of the Castellbisbal–Mollet-Sant Fost railway, and the entire Meridiana Tunnel through central Barcelona. It became the first passenger service to use the Castellbisbal–Mollet-Sant Fost railway, originally designed to serve as Barcelona's rail freight bypass. In 2011, the R7 was shortened, so that it began to operate in its current configuration between Sant Andreu Arenal and Cerdanyola Universitat stations. In the long-term future, it is projected that the R7 will be extended southwards to Barcelona–El Prat Airport, using the Meridiana Tunnel.

List of stations
The following table lists the name of each station served by line R7 in order from south to north; the station's service pattern offered by R7 trains; the transfers to other Rodalies de Catalunya lines, including both commuter and regional rail services; remarkable transfers to other transport systems; the municipality in which each station is located; and the fare zone each station belongs to according to the Autoritat del Transport Metropolità (ATM Àrea de Barcelona) fare-integrated public transport system and Rodalies de Catalunya's own fare zone system for Barcelona commuter rail service lines.

References

External links
 Rodalies de Catalunya official website
 Schedule for the R7 (PDF format)
 R7 Rodalies (rod7cat) on Twitter. Official Twitter account by Rodalies de Catalunya for the R7 with service status updates (tweets usually published only in Catalan)
 
 R7 (rodalia 7) on Twitter. Unofficial Twitter account by Rodalia.info monitoring real-time information about the R7 by its users.
 Information about the R7 at trenscat.cat 

7
Railway services introduced in 2005